Esquire is a title used to denote that a man (among lawyers in the United States, a man or a woman) has a certain social status.

Esquire may also refer to:
Esquire (magazine), an American men's fashion and lifestyle magazine
Esquire (UK Edition)
Esquire (band), an English progressive and symphonic rock band, or their debut album
The Esquires, an American R&B group
Esquire Network, a former American television network
Esquire Records, an Australian record label
Esquire Records (UK), a UK record label
Fender Esquire, electric guitar
Esquires, a coffee house chain in Canada, the United Kingdom, Ireland, and New Zealand
Gyron or esquire, an element in heraldry
Esquire, the feudal title of a squire
Toyota Esquire, a minivan produced between 2014 and 2021